The Daily Telegraph, known online and elsewhere as The Telegraph, is a national British daily broadsheet newspaper published in London by Telegraph Media Group and distributed across the United Kingdom and internationally. It was founded by Arthur B. Sleigh in 1855 as The Daily Telegraph & Courier. Considered a newspaper of record over The Times in the UK in the years up to 1997, The Telegraph has been described as being "one of the world's great titles".

The paper's motto, "Was, is, and will be", appears in the editorial pages and has featured in every edition of the newspaper since 19 April 1858. The paper had a circulation of 363,183 in December 2018, descending further until it withdrew from newspaper circulation audits in 2019, having declined almost 80%, from 1.4 million in 1980. Its sister paper, The Sunday Telegraph, which started in 1961, had a circulation of 281,025 as of December 2018. The two sister newspapers are run separately, with different editorial staff, but there is cross-usage of stories.

The Telegraph has had a number of news scoops, including the outbreak of World War II by rookie reporter Clare Hollingworth, described as "the scoop of the century", the 2009 MP expenses scandalwhich led to a number of high-profile political resignations and for which it was named 2009 British Newspaper of the Yearand its 2016 undercover investigation on the England football manager Sam Allardyce.

History

Founding and early history 
The Daily Telegraph and Courier was founded by Colonel Arthur B. Sleigh in June 1855 to air a personal grievance against the future commander-in-chief of the British Army, Prince George, Duke of Cambridge. Joseph Moses Levy, the owner of The Sunday Times, agreed to print the newspaper, and the first edition was published on 29 June 1855. The paper cost 2d and was four pages long. Nevertheless, the first edition stressed the quality and independence of its articles and journalists:

However, the paper was not a success, and Sleigh was unable to pay Levy the printing bill. Levy took over the newspaper, his aim being to produce a cheaper newspaper than his main competitors in London, the Daily News and The Morning Post, to expand the size of the overall market. Levy appointed his son, Edward Levy-Lawson, Lord Burnham, and Thornton Leigh Hunt to edit the newspaper. Lord Burnham relaunched the paper as The Daily Telegraph, with the slogan "the largest, best, and cheapest newspaper in the world". Hunt laid out the newspaper's principles in a memorandum sent to Levy: "We should report all striking events in science, so told that the intelligent public can understand what has happened and can see its bearing on our daily life and our future. The same principle should apply to all other events—to fashion, to new inventions, to new methods of conducting business".

In 1876, Jules Verne published his novel Michael Strogoff, whose plot takes place during a fictional uprising and war in Siberia. Verne included among the book's characters a war correspondent of The Daily Telegraph, named Harry Blount—who is depicted as an exceptionally dedicated, resourceful and brave journalist, taking great personal risks to follow closely the ongoing war and bring accurate news of it to The Telegraphs readership, ahead of competing papers.

1901 to 1945 
In 1908, Kaiser Wilhelm II of Germany gave a controversial interview to The Daily Telegraph that severely damaged Anglo-German relations and added to international tensions in the build-up to World War I. In 1928, the son of Baron Burnham, Harry Lawson Webster Levy-Lawson, 2nd Baron Burnham, sold the paper to William Berry, 1st Viscount Camrose, in partnership with his brother Gomer Berry, 1st Viscount Kemsley and Edward Iliffe, 1st Baron Iliffe.

In 1937, the newspaper absorbed The Morning Post, which traditionally espoused a conservative position and sold predominantly amongst the retired officer class.  Originally William Ewart Berry, 1st Viscount Camrose, bought The Morning Post with the intention of publishing it alongside The Daily Telegraph, but poor sales of the former led him to merge the two. For some years, the paper was retitled The Daily Telegraph and Morning Post before it reverted to just The Daily Telegraph.  In the late 1930s, Victor Gordon Lennox, The Telegraphs diplomatic editor, published an anti-appeasement private newspaper The Whitehall Letter that received much of its information from leaks from Sir Robert Vansittart, the Permanent Under-Secretary of the Foreign Office, and Rex Leeper, the Foreign Office's Press Secretary. As a result, Gordon Lennox was monitored by MI5. In 1939, The Telegraph published Clare Hollingworth's scoop that Germany was to invade Poland.

In November 1940, Fleet Street, with its close proximity to the river and docklands, was subjected to almost daily bombing raids by the Luftwaffe and The Telegraph started printing in Manchester at Kemsley House (now The Printworks entertainment venue), which was run by Camrose's brother Kemsley.  Manchester quite often printed the entire run of The Telegraph when its Fleet Street offices were under threat.  The name Kemsley House was changed to Thomson House in 1959. In 1986, printing of Northern editions of the Daily and Sunday Telegraph moved to Trafford Park and in 2008 to Newsprinters at Knowsley, Liverpool.

During the Second World War, The Daily Telegraph covertly helped in the recruitment of code-breakers for Bletchley Park. The ability to solve The Telegraphs crossword in under 12 minutes was considered to be a recruitment test. The newspaper was asked to organise a crossword competition, after which each of the successful participants was contacted and asked if they would be prepared to undertake "a particular type of work as a contribution to the war effort". The competition itself was won by F. H. W. Hawes of Dagenham who finished the crossword in less than eight minutes.

1946 to 1985 
Both the Camrose (Berry) and Burnham (Levy-Lawson) families remained involved in management until Conrad Black took control in 1986. On the death of his father in 1954, Seymour Berry, 2nd Viscount Camrose assumed the chairmanship of the Daily Telegraph with his brother Michael Berry, Baron Hartwell as his editor-in-chief. During this period, the company saw the launch of sister paper The Sunday Telegraph in 1960.

1986 to 2004 
Canadian businessman Conrad Black, through companies controlled by him, bought the Telegraph Group in 1986. Black, through his holding company Ravelston Corporation, owned 78% of Hollinger Inc. which in turn owned 30% of Hollinger International.  Hollinger International in turn owned the Telegraph Group and other publications such as the Chicago Sun-Times, the Jerusalem Post and The Spectator.

On 18 January 2004, Black was dismissed as chairman of the Hollinger International board over allegations of financial wrongdoing. Black was also sued by the company. Later that day, it was reported that the Barclay brothers had agreed to purchase Black's 78% interest in Hollinger Inc. for £245m, giving them a controlling interest in the company, and to buy out the minority shareholders later.  However, a lawsuit was filed by the Hollinger International board to try to block Black from selling his shares in Hollinger Inc. until an investigation into his dealings was completed. Black filed a countersuit but, eventually, United States judge Leo Strine sided with the Hollinger International board and blocked Black from selling his Hollinger Inc. shares to the twins.

On 7 March 2004, the twins announced that they were launching another bid, this time just for The Daily Telegraph and its Sunday sister paper rather than all of Hollinger Inc. The then owner of the Daily Express, Richard Desmond, was also interested in purchasing the paper, selling his interest in several pornographic magazines to finance the initiative. Desmond withdrew in March 2004, when the price climbed above £600m, as did Daily Mail and General Trust plc a few months later on 17 June.

Since 2004 
In November 2004, The Telegraph celebrated the tenth anniversary of its website, Electronic Telegraph, now renamed www.telegraph.co.uk. The Electronic Telegraph launched in 1995 with The Daily Telegraph Guide to the Internet' by writer Sue Schofield for an annual charge of £180.00. On 8 May 2006, the first stage of a major redesign of the website took place, with a wider page layout and greater prominence for audio, video and journalist blogs.

On 10 October 2005, The Daily Telegraph relaunched to incorporate a tabloid sports section and a new standalone business section. The Daily Mails star columnist and political analyst Simon Heffer left that paper in October 2005 to rejoin The Daily Telegraph, where he has become associate editor. Heffer has written two columns a week for the paper since late October 2005 and is a regular contributor to the news podcast. In November 2005 the first regular podcast service by a newspaper in the UK was launched. Just before Christmas 2005, it was announced that The Telegraph titles would be moving from Canada Place in Canary Wharf, to new offices at Victoria Plaza at 111 Buckingham Palace Road near Victoria Station in central London. The new office features a "hub and spoke" layout for the newsroom to produce content for print and online editions.

In October 2006, with its relocation to Victoria, the company was renamed the Telegraph Media Group, repositioning itself as a multimedia company. On 2 September 2008, the Daily Telegraph was printed with colour on each page for the first time when it left Westferry for Newsprinters at Broxbourne, Hertfordshire, another arm of the Murdoch (Rupert Murdoch) company. The paper is also printed in Liverpool and Glasgow by Newsprinters. In May 2009, the daily and Sunday editions published details of MPs' expenses. This led to a number of high-profile resignations from both the ruling Labour administration and the Conservative opposition.

In June 2014, The Telegraph was criticised by Private Eye for its policy of replacing experienced journalists and news managers with less-experienced staff and search engine optimisers.

On 26 October 2019, the Financial Times reported that the Barclay Brothers were about to put the Telegraph Media Group up for sale. The Financial Times also reported that the Daily Mail and General Trust (owner of the Daily Mail, The Mail on Sunday, Metro and Ireland on Sunday) would be interested in buying.

The Daily Telegraph supported Liz Truss in the July–September 2022 Conservative Party leadership election.

Political stance 
The Daily Telegraph is politically conservative and has endorsed the Conservative Party at every UK general election since 1945. The personal links between the paper's editors and the leadership of the Conservative Party, along with the paper's generally right-wing stance and influence over Conservative activists, have led the paper commonly to be referred to, especially in Private Eye, as the Torygraph. Even when Conservative support was shown to have slumped in the opinion polls and Labour gained the ascendant, the newspaper remained loyal to the Conservatives. This loyalty continued after Labour ousted the Conservatives from power by an election result in 1997, and in the face of Labour election wins in 2001 and the third successive Labour election win in 2005.

When the Barclay brothers purchased the Telegraph Group for around £665 million in late June 2004, Sir David Barclay suggested that The Daily Telegraph might no longer be the "house newspaper" of the Conservatives in the future. In an interview with The Guardian he said, "Where the government are right we shall support them". The editorial board endorsed the Conservative Party in the 2005 general election.

During the 2014 Scottish independence referendum, the paper supported the Better Together 'No' Campaign. Alex Salmond, the former leader of the SNP, called The Telegraph "extreme" on Question Time in September 2015.

In the 2016 United Kingdom European Union membership referendum it endorsed voting to leave the EU.

During the 2019 Conservative leadership election, The Daily Telegraph endorsed their former columnist Boris Johnson. In 2019, former columnist Graham Norton, who had left the paper in late 2018, said "about a year before I left, it took a turn" and criticised it for "toxic" political stances, namely for a piece defending US Supreme Court then-nominee Brett Kavanaugh and for being "a mouthpiece for Boris Johnson" whose columns were allegedly published with "no fact-checking at all".

It was fined £30,000 in 2015 for "sending an unsolicited email to hundreds of thousands of its subscribers, urging them to vote for the Conservatives."

LGBT+ rights 
In 2012, prior to the legalisation of same-sex marriage in the United Kingdom, Telegraph View published an editorial stating that it was a "pointless distraction" as "many [gay couples] already avail themselves of the civil partnerships introduced by Labour". The Telegraph wrote in another editorial that same year that it feared that changing "the law on gay marriage risks inflaming anti-homosexual bigotry".

In 2015, the newspaper published an article by former editor Charles Moore claiming a "gay rights sharia" was dictating what the LGBT+ community should believe following Dolce & Gabbana's openly gay founders criticising gay adoptions. Moore wrote that "If you are gay, Mr Strudwick seemed to assert, there are certain things you must believe. Nothing else is permitted under the gay rights sharia." Moore has previously expressed his views that civil partnerships achieved a "balance" for heterosexual and homosexual couples. In 2013, he wrote that "Respectable people are truly terrified of being thought anti-homosexual. In a way, they are right to be, because attacking people for their personal preferences can be a nasty thing."

Also in 2015, The Telegraph published its "Out at Work" list, naming "the top 50 list of LGBT executives".

Since then, The Telegraph appeared to shift towards a more liberal attitude on LGBT+ issues, publishing articles that then-Prime Minister Theresa May needed to be "serious about LGBT equality" and that "bathroom bills" in Texas – which were criticised as being transphobic – were "a Kafkaesque state intrusion". The newspaper also featured an article written by Maria Munir about their experience coming out to President Barack Obama as non-binary. Stonewall CEO Ruth Hunt penned an article in The Telegraph after the Orlando nightclub shooting in June 2016 that the attack on a gay nightclub "grew out of everyday homophobia".

Also in 2016, Telegraph Executive Director Lord Black was awarded Peer of the Year at the 2016 PinkNews Awards for his campaigning on LGBT rights.

The Telegraph has published articles which have been criticised by PinkNews as transphobic. In 2017, the newspaper published an article by Allison Pearson titled: "Will our spineless politicians' love affair with LGBT ever end?", arguing that NHS patients' being asked their sexual orientation was unnecessary and another in 2018 with the headline: "The tyranny of the transgender minority has got to be stopped".

Sister publications

The Sunday Telegraph 

The Daily Telegraphs sister Sunday paper was founded in 1961. The writer Sir Peregrine Worsthorne is probably the best known journalist associated with the title (1961–1997), eventually being editor for three years from 1986. In 1989, the Sunday title was briefly merged into a seven-day operation under Max Hastings's overall control. In 2005, the paper was revamped, with Stella being added to the more traditional television and radio section. It costs £2.20 and includes separate Money, Living, Sport and Business supplements.
Circulation of The Sunday Telegraph in July 2010 was 505,214 (ABC).

The Young Telegraph 
The Young Telegraph was a weekly section of The Daily Telegraph published as a 14-page supplement in the weekend edition of the newspaper. The Young Telegraph featured a mixture of news, features, cartoon strips and product reviews aimed at 8–12-year-olds. It was edited by Damien Kelleher (1993–1997) and Kitty Melrose (1997–1999). Launched in 1990, the award-winning supplement also ran original serialised stories featuring popular brands such as Young Indiana Jones and the British children's sitcom Maid Marian and Her Merry Men.

In 1995, an interactive spin-off called Electronic Young Telegraph was launched on floppy disk. Described as an interactive computer magazine for children, Electronic Young Telegraph was edited by Adam Tanswell, who led the relaunch of the product on CD-Rom in 1998. Electronic Young Telegraph featured original content including interactive quizzes, informative features and computer games, as well as entertainment news and reviews. It was later re-branded as T:Drive in 1999.

Website 

Telegraph.co.uk is the online version of the newspaper. It uses the banner title The Telegraph and includes articles from the print editions of The Daily Telegraph and The Sunday Telegraph, as well as web-only content such as breaking news, features, picture galleries and blogs. It was named UK Consumer Website of the Year in 2007 and Digital Publisher of the year in 2009 by the Association of Online Publishers. The site is overseen by Kate Day, digital director of Telegraph Media Group. Other staff include Shane Richmond, head of technology (editorial), and Ian Douglas, head of digital production. The site, which has been the focus of the group's efforts to create an integrated news operation producing content for print and online from the same newsroom, completed a relaunch during 2008 involving the use of the Escenic content management system, popular among northern European and Scandinavian newspaper groups. Telegraph TV is a Video on Demand service run by The Daily Telegraph and the Sunday Telegraph. It is hosted on The Telegraphs website, telegraph.co.uk.

Telegraph.co.uk became the most popular UK newspaper site in April 2008. It was overtaken by Guardian.co.uk in April 2009 and later by "Mail Online". As of December 2010, "Telegraph.co.uk" was the third most visited British newspaper website with 1.7 million daily browsers compared to 2.3 million for "Guardian.co.uk" and nearly 3 million for "Mail Online".

In November 2012, international customers accessing the Telegraph.co.uk site would have to sign up for a subscription package. Visitors had access to 20 free articles a month before having to subscribe for unlimited access. In March 2013, the pay meter system was also rolled out in the UK.

History 
The website was launched, under the name electronic telegraph at midday on 15 November 1994 at the headquarters of The Daily Telegraph at Canary Wharf in London Docklands with Ben Rooney as its first editor.  It was Europe's first daily web-based newspaper. At this time, the modern internet was still in its infancy, with as few as 10,000 websites estimated to have existed at the time – compared to more than 100 billion by 2009. In 1994, only around 1% of the British population (some 600,000 people) had internet access at home, compared to more than 80% in 2009.

Initially, the site published only the top stories from the print edition of the newspaper but it gradually increased its coverage until virtually all of the newspaper was carried online and the website was also publishing original material. The website, hosted on a Sun Microsystems Sparc 20 server and connected via a 64 kbit/s leased line from Demon Internet, was edited by Ben Rooney.

An early coup for the site was the publication of articles by Ambrose Evans-Pritchard on Bill Clinton and the Whitewater controversy. The availability of the articles online brought a large American audience to the site. In 1997, the Clinton administration issued a 331-page report that accused Evans-Pritchard of peddling "right-wing inventions". Derek Bishton, who by then had succeeded Rooney as editor, later wrote: "In the days before ET it would have been highly unlikely that anyone in the US would have been aware of Evans-Pritchard's work – and certainly not to the extent that the White House would be forced to issue such a lengthy rebuttal." Bishton, who later became consulting editor for Telegraph Media Group, was followed as editor by Richard Burton, who was made redundant in August 2006. Edward Roussel replaced Burton.

My Telegraph 
My Telegraph offers a platform for readers to have their own blog, save articles, and network with other readers. Launched in May 2007, My Telegraph won a Cross Media Award from international newspaper organisation IFRA in October 2007. One of the judges, Robert Cauthorn, described the project as "the best deployment of blogging yet seen in any newspaper anywhere in the world".

Notable stories 
In December 2010, Telegraph reporters posing as constituents secretly recorded Business Secretary Vince Cable. In an undisclosed part of the transcript given to the BBC's Robert Peston by a whistleblower unhappy that The Telegraph had not published Cable's comments in full, Cable stated in reference to Rupert Murdoch's News Corporation takeover bid for BSkyB, "I have declared war on Mr Murdoch and I think we are going to win." Following this revelation, Cable had his responsibility for media affairs – including ruling on Murdoch's takeover plans – withdrawn from his role as business secretary.

In May 2011, the Press Complaints Commission upheld a complaint regarding The Telegraphs use of subterfuge: "On this occasion, the commission was not convinced that the public interest was such as to justify proportionately this level of subterfuge." In July 2011, a firm of private investigators hired by The Telegraph to track the source of the leak concluded "strong suspicion" that two former Telegraph employees who had moved to News International, one of them Will Lewis, had gained access to the transcript and audio files and leaked them to Peston.

2009 MP expenses scandal 

In May 2009, The Daily Telegraph obtained a full copy of all the expenses claims of British Members of Parliament. The Telegraph began publishing, in instalments from 8 May 2009, certain MPs' expenses.

The Telegraph justified the publication of the information because it contended that the official information due to be released would have omitted key information about redesignating of second-home nominations. This led to a number of high-profile resignations from both the ruling Labour administration and the Conservative opposition.

2016 Sam Allardyce investigation 

In September 2016, Telegraph reporters posing as businessmen filmed England manager Sam Allardyce, offering to give advice on how to get around on FA rules on player third party ownership and negotiating a £400,000 deal. The investigation saw Allardyce leave his job by mutual consent on 27 September and making the statement "entrapment has won".

Awards 
The Daily Telegraph has been named the National Newspaper of the Year in 2009, 1996 and 1993, while The Sunday Telegraph won the same award in 1999.

Its investigation on the 2009 expenses scandal was named the "Scoop of the Year" in 2009, with William Lewis winning "Journalist of the Year". The Telegraph won "Team of the Year" in 2004 for its coverage of the Iraq War. The paper also won "Columnist of the Year" three years' running from 2002 to 2004: Zoë Heller (2002), Robert Harris (2003) and Boris Johnson (2004).

Charity and fundraising work 
In 1979, following a letter in The Daily Telegraph and a Government report highlighting the shortfall in care available for premature babies, Bliss, the special care baby charity, was founded. In 2009, as part of the Bliss 30th birthday celebrations, the charity was chosen as one of four beneficiaries of the newspaper's Christmas Charity Appeal. In February 2010, a cheque was presented to Bliss for £120,000.

In 2014, The Telegraph designed a Newspaper-themed Paddington Bear statue, one of fifty located around London prior to the release of the film Paddington, which was auctioned to raise funds for the National Society for the Prevention of Cruelty to Children (NSPCC).

Criticisms

Accusation of news coverage influence by advertisers 

In July 2014, the Daily Telegraph was criticised for carrying links on its website to pro-Kremlin articles supplied by a Russian state-funded publication that downplayed any Russian involvement in the downing of the passenger jet Malaysia Airlines Flight 17. These had featured on its website as part of a commercial deal, but were later removed. The paper is paid £900,000 a year to include the supplement Russia Beyond the Headlines, a publication sponsored by the Rossiyskaya Gazeta, the Russian government's official newspaper. It is paid a further £750,000 a year for a similar arrangement with the Chinese state in relation to the pro-Beijing China Watch advertising supplement.

In February 2015, the chief political commentator of the Daily Telegraph, Peter Oborne, resigned. Oborne accused the paper of a "form of fraud on its readers" for its coverage of the bank HSBC in relation to a Swiss tax-dodging scandal that was widely covered by other news media. He alleged that editorial decisions about news content had been heavily influenced by the advertising arm of the newspaper because of commercial interests. Professor Jay Rosen at New York University stated that Oborne's resignation statement was "one of the most important things a journalist has written about journalism lately".

Oborne cited other instances of advertising strategy influencing the content of articles, linking the refusal to take an editorial stance on the repression of democratic demonstrations in Hong Kong to the Telegraph support from China. Additionally, he said that favourable reviews of the Cunard cruise liner Queen Mary II appeared in the Telegraph, noting: "On 10 May last year The Telegraph ran a long feature on Cunard's Queen Mary II liner on the news review page. This episode looked to many like a plug for an advertiser on a page normally dedicated to serious news analysis. I again checked and certainly Telegraph competitors did not view Cunard's liner as a major news story. Cunard is an important Telegraph advertiser."

In response, the Telegraph called Oborne's statement an "astonishing and unfounded attack, full of inaccuracy and innuendo". Later that month, Telegraph editor Chris Evans invited journalists at the newspaper to contribute their thoughts on the issue. Press Gazette reported later in 2015 that Oborne had joined the Daily Mail tabloid newspaper and The Telegraph had "issued new guidelines over the way editorial and commercial staff work together".

In January 2017, the Telegraph Media Group had a higher number of upheld complaints than any other UK newspaper by its regulator IPSO. Most of these findings pertained to inaccuracy, as with other UK newspapers.

In October 2017, a number of major western news organisations whose coverage had irked Beijing were excluded from Xi Jinping's speech event launching a new politburo. However, the Daily Telegraph had been granted an invitation to the event.

In April 2019, Business Insider reported The Telegraph had partnered with Facebook to publish articles "downplaying 'technofears' and praising the company".

Premature obituaries 

The paper published premature obituaries for Cockie Hoogterp, the second wife of Baron Blixen, Dave Swarbrick in 1999, and Dorothy Southworth Ritter, the widow of Tex Ritter and mother of John Ritter, in August 2001.

Accusation of antisemitism 
Editors for both the Daily Telegraph and the Sunday Telegraph have been criticised by Guardian columnist Owen Jones for publishing and authoring articles which espouse an anti-Semitic conspiracy theory. In 2018, Allister Heath, the editor of the Sunday Telegraph wrote that "Cultural Marxism is running rampant." Assistant comment editor of the Daily Telegraph, Sherelle Jacobs, also used the term in 2019. The Daily Telegraph also published an anonymous civil servant who stated: "There is a strong presence of Anglophobia, combined with cultural Marxism that runs through the civil service."

Islamic extremism and scout groups 

In January 2019, the paper published an article written by Camilla Tominey titled "Police called in after Scout group run from mosque is linked to Islamic extremist and Holocaust denier" in which it was reported that the police were investigating Ahammed Hussain, the Leader of the Scout Group at the Lewisham Islamic Centre, because he had links to extremist Muslim groups that promoted terrorism and antisemitism.

In January 2020, the paper issued an official apology and accepted that the article contained many falsehoods, and that Hussain had never supported or promoted terrorism, or been anti-Semitic. The paper paid Hussain damages and costs. In their apology they said: "The article was published by our client following receipt of information in good faith from the Scout Association and the Henry Jackson Society; nevertheless our client now accepts that the article (using that expression to refer to both print and online versions) is defamatory of your client and will apologise to him for publishing it."

China Watch 
In 2016, the Hong Kong Free Press reported that The Daily Telegraph was receiving £750,000 annually to carry a supplement called 'China Watch' as part of a commercial deal with Chinese state-run newspaper China Daily. The Telegraph published the supplement once a month in print, and published it online at least until March 2020. As of April 2020, The Telegraph appeared to have removed China Watch from its website, along with another advertisement feature section by a Chinese state-run media outlet titled "People's Daily Online". This followed the People's Daily Online section carrying misinformation about COVID-19, including claims that traditional Chinese medicine could help fight the virus.

The Guardian reported in 2018 that the China Watch newspaper supplement was being carried by The Telegraph along with other newspapers of record such as The New York Times, The Wall Street Journal and Le Figaro.

COVID-19 misinformation 

In January 2021 British press regulator, the Independent Press Standards Organisation ordered The Daily Telegraph to publish corrections for a "significantly misleading" article published by Toby Young in July 2020 article "When we have herd immunity Boris will face a reckoning on this pointless and damaging lockdown" which spread COVID-19 misinformation that the common cold provided "natural immunity" to COVID-19 and that London was "probably approaching herd immunity".

Climate change denialism and misinformation 
The Telegraph has published multiple columns and news articles which promote pseudoscientific views on climate change, and misleadingly cast the subject of climate change as a subject of active scientific debate when there is a scientific consensus on climate change. It has published columns about the "conspiracy behind the Anthropogenic Global Warming myth", described climate scientists as "white-coated prima donnas and narcissists," and claimed that "global warming causes about as much damage as benefits." In 2015, a Telegraph news article falsely claimed that scientists predicted a mini-ice age by 2030. Climate change denying journalist James Delingpole was first to use "Climategate" on his Telegraph blog for a manufactured controversy where emails were leaked from climate scientists ahead of the Copenhagen climate summit and misleadingly presented to give the appearance that the climate scientists were engaged in fraud.

In 2014, The Telegraph was one of several media titles to give evidence to the House of Commons Select Committee 'Communicating climate science'. The paper told MPs they believe climate change is happening and humans play a role in it. Editors told the committee, "we believe that the climate is changing, that the reason for that change includes human activity, but that human ingenuity and adaptability should not be ignored in favour of economically damaging prescriptions."

Dominic Cummings comments 
In July 2021, Prime Minister Boris Johnson's former chief advisor, Dominic Cummings, said that Johnson had always referred to The Telegraph (and not the British public) as his "Real Boss".

Owen Paterson 
The Daily Telegraph, in particular its columnist and former editor Charles Moore, were staunch supporters of Owen Paterson, a former MP and minister who resigned after it was found that he had breached advocacy rules to lobby ministers for fees. A plan to overhaul the Commons standard and spare Paterson from being suspended and a possible recall petition that follows was leaked to the newspaper and it was "approvingly" splashed across the paper's front page. Boris Johnson flew back from the COP 26 summit in Glasgow to attend a Telegraph journalists' reunion at the Garrick and was seen to leave the club with Moore the same evening.

Notable people

Editors

Notable columnists and journalists 

 Katharine Birbalsingh, columnist
 Jamie Carragher, columnist
 Dia Chakravarty, columnist
 Robbie Collin, film critic
 Michael Deacon, columnist
 David Eimer, foreign correspondent
 William Hague, columnist
 Simon Heffer, columnist 
 Roger Highfield, former science editor
 Boris Johnson, former political columnist
 Herbert Hughes, music critic, 1911–1932
 Anthony Loyd, one-time war correspondent
 Charles Moore, columnist
 Anne-Elisabeth Moutet, columnist
 Andrew Orlowski, business and technology columnist
 J. H. B. Peel, columnist
 Peter Simple, the pseudonym of Michael Wharton, who wrote a humorous column, "Way of the World", from 1957 to 2006.
 Serena Sinclair, former fashion editor
 Mark Steyn, former columnist
 Zoe Strimpel, lifestyle columnist
 Norman Tebbit, columnist
 Auberon Waugh, a previous columnist

See also 

 List of the oldest newspapers
 History of journalism
 Newspaper of record

References

Further reading 
 Burnham, E. F. L. (1955). Peterborough Court: the story of the Daily Telegraph. Cassell.
 Merrill, John C. and Harold A. Fisher. The world's great dailies: profiles of fifty newspapers (1980) pp. 111–16.
 The House The Berrys Built by Duff Hart-Davis. Concerns the history of The Daily Telegraph''' from its inception to 1986. Illustrated with references and illustrations of William Ewart Berry, 1st Viscount Camrose (later called Lord Camrose). 
 William Camrose: Giant of Fleet Street by his son Lord Hartwell. Illustrated biography with black-and-white photographic plates and includes an index. Concerns his links with The Daily Telegraph''.

External links 

1855 establishments in England
Conservative media in the United Kingdom
Daily newspapers published in the United Kingdom
National newspapers published in the United Kingdom
Newspapers established in 1855
Newspapers published in London
Telegraph Media Group